Suzanne Glowiak Hilton is a Democratic member of the Illinois Senate from the 24th district. The 24th district includes all or parts of Clarendon Hills, Downers Grove, Elmhurst, Glen Ellyn, Hinsdale, Lisle, Lombard, Oak Brook, Villa Park, Western Springs, Westmont, and Willowbrook. Glowiak narrowly defeated Republican incumbent Chris Nybo in the 2018 general election. She took office January 9, 2019.

Prior to her election to the Illinois Senate, Glowiak served two terms as a member of the Western Springs Board of Trustees.

As of July 2022, Senator Glowiak is a member of the following Illinois Senate committees:

 Appropriations - Criminal Justice Committee (SAPP-SACJ)
 (Chairwoman of) Commerce Committee (SCOM)
 Ethics Committee (SETH)
 Licensed Activities Committee (SLIC)
 (Chairwoman of) Redistricting - DuPage County Committee (SRED-SRDC)
 Tourism and Hospitality Committee (STOU)
 Transportation Committee (STRN)

Electoral history

References

External links
 Campaign website

Living people
21st-century American politicians
21st-century American women politicians
Illinois Institute of Technology alumni
Northwestern University alumni
Engineers from Illinois
Democratic Party Illinois state senators
People from Western Springs, Illinois
American mechanical engineers
Women state legislators in Illinois
Year of birth missing (living people)